Kwon Young-il is a South Korean male curler and curling coach.

Teams

Record as a coach of national teams

References

External links

Living people

South Korean male curlers
Curlers at the 2007 Asian Winter Games
Medalists at the 2007 Asian Winter Games
Asian Games medalists in curling
Asian Games gold medalists for South Korea
South Korean curling coaches
Year of birth missing (living people)
Place of birth missing (living people)
21st-century South Korean people